Ekigho Ehiosun (born 25 June 1990) is a Nigerian football striker who plays for Hapoel Acre.

Club career
Ehiosun was born in Warri. He moved from Delta United to fellow Delta State team Warri Wolves in 2008. He scored ten goals in 2009-10 to lead the club. One-third of the way through the 2010-11 season Ehiosun was the leading scorer with 7 league goals, including a hat-trick against Sharks F.C.

Samsunspor
In July 2011, Ehiosun, moved to Turkish club Samsunspor on a one-year contract, with the option of two more.

Gençlerbirliği
On 3 August 2012, Turkish club Gençlerbirliği signed Ekigho on a three-year deal.

Gabala
In July 2014, Ehiosun moved to Gabala of the Azerbaijan Premier League on a season-long loan deal.

Samsunspor Return
In July 2015, Ehiosun resigned for Samsunspor on a two-year contract.

Gabala return
On 21 September 2017, Ehiosun signed a one-contract with Gabala. Gabala announced that Ehiosun had left the club on 4 January 2018.

International career
After training with the Nigeria National B team, he was called in as an emergency replacement for Victor Anichebe in the Eagles friendly against Sierra Leone. Ehiosun scored seven minutes after coming on as a sub, becoming the 58th player in Nigeria history to score in his debut.

Career statistics

Club

International

Statistics accurate as of match played 23 May 2012

International goals
Scores and results list Nigeria's goal tally first.

References

1990 births
Living people
Association football forwards
Nigerian footballers
Nigerian expatriate footballers
Nigeria international footballers
Gençlerbirliği S.K. footballers
Warri Wolves F.C. players
Samsunspor footballers
Gabala FC players
Hapoel Acre F.C. players
Azerbaijan Premier League players
Süper Lig players
TFF First League players
Liga Leumit players
Expatriate footballers in Turkey
Expatriate footballers in Azerbaijan
Expatriate footballers in Israel
Nigerian expatriate sportspeople in Turkey
Nigerian expatriate sportspeople in Azerbaijan
Nigerian expatriate sportspeople in Israel
Sportspeople from Warri